Johannes Friedrich (born June 20, 1948 in Bielefeld-Gadderbaum) is German Lutheran theologian and was a German Lutheran bishop.

Education and career
Friedrich studied theology at the University of Erlangen-Nuremberg and at the University of Tübingen, was reverend in Nuremberg, campus minister at the University of Erlangen-Nuremberg and German Lutheran Provost at Redeemer Church in Jerusalem. He is a member of the EKD Council of the Protestant Church in Germany, since 1999 Landesbischof (bishop) of the Evangelical Lutheran Church in Bavaria and from 2005 leading bishop of the United Evangelical Lutheran Church of Germany. Friedrich worked on a Lutheran/Catholic Joint Declaration on the Doctrine of Justification (JD) and supports the Christian–Islamic dialogue in order to cause the Christian–Islamic understanding.

In 2011 Friedrich was succeeded as bishop of the ELCB by Heinrich Bedford-Strohm.

Other activities
 Deloitte Germany, Member of the Advisory Board

Works available in German

Anvertraute Talente. 2008
Verantwortung gemeindenah und in weltweitem Horizont. 2008
Das Leitungsamt der Kirche in unserer Zeit. 2008
Zeugen der Wahrheit Gottes. 2006
Den einmal begonnenen Weg im festen Blick auf das Ziel fortsetzen. 2005
Die Confessio Augustana und die Christenheit. 2005
In ökumenischer Gesinnung handeln. 2004
Die Zukunft gestalten. 2004
Zuversicht trotz Zwischentief. 2003
Vertrauen in die ökumenische Gemeinschaft stiften. 2002
Ökumene in Deutschland - Blick voraus. 2002
Zum gemeinsamen Zeugnis berufen. 2001
Unterwegs zur Gemeinschaft. 2000
Profil zeigen. 2000
Gott im Bruder?. 1977
Gott im Anderen? eine methodenkritische Untersuchung von Redaktion, Überlieferung und Tradition in Matthäus 25,31-46. 1976
Rechtfertigung. 1976

References

External links

German National Library

1948 births
German Lutheran theologians
University of Tübingen alumni
Clergy from Bielefeld
Living people
German male non-fiction writers
21st-century German Lutheran bishops